Grylliscus is a genus of insect in family Trigonidiidae.

Taxonomy
The Orthoptera Species File database lists the following species:
Grylliscus gussakowski Tarbinsky, 1930

References

Trigonidiidae